Bernstine is a surname. Notable people with the surname include:

Aaron Bernstine (born 1984), American politician
Jordan Bernstine (born 1989), American football player
Rod Bernstine (born 1965), American football player

See also
Bernstein
Burnstine